Czech Republic competed at the 2011 World Aquatics Championships in Shanghai, China between July 16 and 31, 2011.

Open water swimming

Men

Women

Swimming

Czech Republic qualified 9 swimmers.

Men

Women

Synchronised swimming

Czech Republic has qualified 2 athletes in synchronised swimming.

Women

References

Nations at the 2011 World Aquatics Championships
2011 in Czech sport
Czech Republic at the World Aquatics Championships